These are the results for the girls' individual event at the 2018 Summer Youth Olympics.

Schedule 
All times are local (UTC−3).

Results

References

External links
 Results 
 Play-off results 

Golf at the 2018 Summer Youth Olympics